"Amazing" is a song by Irish boy band Westlife. It was released on 20 February 2006 as the third and final single from their sixth studio album, Face to Face (2005). The song peaked at number four on the UK Singles Chart. It debuted with 16,316 sales in the UK alone.

Track listings
UK CD single
 "Amazing" (single mix)
 "Miss You When I'm Dreaming"
 "Exclusive Westlife Chat"

European CD single
 "Amazing" (single mix)
 "Still Here"

European maxi-CD single
 "Amazing" (single mix) – 2:49
 "Miss You When I'm Dreaming" – 3:27
 "Flying Without Wings" (acoustic version) – 3:30
 "Amazing" (single mix video) – 2:49

Australian CD single
 "Amazing" (single remix) – 2:49
 "Miss You When I'm Dreaming" – 3:27
 "Amazing" (single remix video) – 2:49

Charts

Weekly charts

Year-end charts

References

External links
Official Westlife Website

2000s ballads
2005 songs
2006 singles
RCA Records singles
Songs written by Carl Falk
Songs written by Didrik Thott
Songs written by Jake Schulze
Songs written by Kristian Lundin
Songs written by Savan Kotecha
Songs written by Sebastian Thott
Sony BMG singles
Sony Music singles
Syco Music singles
Westlife songs
Song recordings produced by Carl Falk